Marymount International School is a private day and boarding school for girls in Kingston upon Thames, London, England. Founded by the Religious of the Sacred Heart of Mary in 1955 it is open to children of all faiths or none. It is situated on a  campus  from central London.

Marymount is a fully accredited IB World School and is also accredited by the Council of International Schools and the Middle States Association of Colleges and Schools (USA). It is a member of the Girls' Schools Association. As an international school it attracts children from expatriate families and also accepts local students.

History 
Marymount International School was founded in 1955 by the Religious of the Sacred Heart of Mary to educate children from the business and diplomatic community. In 1979 it became the first school in the United Kingdom to fully adopt the International Baccalaureate programme as its main curriculum of instruction.

Academics 
Marymount has an excellent record in the IB Diploma. In 2011, 20% of IB Diploma candidates received a score of 1 point or higher, placing them in the top 5% worldwide. In 2011 one candidate received a perfect score, a result achieved by less 0.2% of students worldwide. In 2008, one Marymount candidate received a perfect result of 45 points. In 2007, two Marymount IB Diploma candidates received the perfect score of 45 points, two of only 65 students in the world. Since, at least one student of the graduating class has received a full 45 points, often making them the class valedictorian.

Curriculum
Year groups are called "grades" rather than "years". Marymount follows the Middle Years Programme (MYP) for girls aged 11 to 18 and the Diploma Programme for the last two years.

Student life
Marymount is an international school which caters to a diverse student population and incorporates aspects of both the American and British educational traditions. The British-style blazer is part of the prescribed uniform and the house system is an integral part of student life. American nomenclature for year groups is used, meaning there is no "sixth form" as the final year of secondary education (age 17/18) is grade 12 rather than year 13 ("Upper Sixth"). Student leaders are elected into a "Student Council" and the head of the council is known as a president rather than head girl. In the middle of the school year, grade 10 and 11 students are elected into the National Honor Society. A formal graduation ceremony is held at the end of the year to farewell grade 12 students.

Houses
The four houses are named after founders of the Religious of the Sacred Heart of Mary.
St Jean
St Constance
St Felix
St Croix

Boarding
Boarding is an option to all students and about a quarter of the student body are boarders. They are housed in four main halls and cared for by houseparents and a resident nurse. Younger boarders usually reside in triple rooms and older students are allocated either double or single rooms.

Pastoral Care
As a Catholic school, spiritual life is an important aspect of student life. Students are expected to attend chapel services and invited to actively participate. A Sacrament of Confirmation is held every two years.

Students may also take part in community service projects through exchange programmes with its sister schools in the RSHM international network of schools.

Notable alumnae
Elizabeth Gill Lui, American photographer 
Gail Zappa, wife of Frank Zappa

References

External links
 School Website
 RSHM International Network of Schools 
 Profile on MyDaughter
 Profile on the ISC website
 ISI Inspection Reports

Private schools in the Royal Borough of Kingston upon Thames
Private girls' schools in London
Educational institutions established in 1955
International schools in London
International Baccalaureate schools in England
Member schools of the Girls' Schools Association
Boarding schools in London
Catholic boarding schools in England
Roman Catholic private schools in the Archdiocese of Southwark
1955 establishments in England
American international schools in the United Kingdom